Twain Harte Dam (National ID # CA00649) is a multiple arch dam in Tuolumne County, California. Its reservoir is Twain Harte Lake and it is located near Twain Harte, California.

Developers began building Twain Harte Dam in the summer of 1927. It was completed in 1928 and is owned by the Twain Harte Lake Association.

In August 2014, fracturing of a granite dome known as "the Rock" located adjacent to the dam forced the closing and draining of the lake for safety reasons. It was feared the dam would fail and there would be a flash flood in Sullivan Creek. The cause of this fracturing is a process known as exfoliation.

Twain Harte Lake is the name of the reservoir created by Twain Harte Dam. The lake is used for recreation and is available only to members of the Twain Harte Lake Association.

See also 
List of dams and reservoirs in California
List of lakes in California

References

Dams in California
Dams in the San Joaquin River basin
Buildings and structures in Tuolumne County, California
Buttress dams
Reservoirs in Tuolumne County, California
Dams completed in 1928
1928 establishments in California